Frederick of Austria (Friedrich I. von Österreich) may refer to:

 Frederick I of Austria (Babenberg) (c. 1175 – 1198), of the Babenberg family, duke from 1195 to 1198
 Frederick I of Austria (Habsburg) (c. 1289 – 1330) of the Habsburg family, duke from 1308 to 1330
 Frederick II of Austria (1211–1246), Babenberg duke
 Frederick III of Austria (1347–1362), Habsburg duke
 Frederick IV of Austria (1382–1439), Habsburg duke of the Tirol, son of Leopold III of Austria
 Frederick V of Austria (1415–1493), later Frederick III, Holy Roman Emperor
 Archduke Frederick, Duke of Teschen (1856–1936)